Gallane, also systematically named trihydridogallium, is an inorganic compound of gallium with the chemical formula  (also written as ). It is a photosensitive, colourless gas that cannot be concentrated in pure form. Gallane is both the simplest member of the gallanes, and the prototype of the monogallanes. It has no economic uses, and is only intentionally produced for academic reasons.

It has been detected as a transient species in the gas phase; also at low temperature (3.5 K) following the reaction of laser ablated gallium atoms and dihydrogen, and more recently in an argon matrix doped with vapour over solid digallane, Ga2H6.

Structure of monomeric GaH3
I.R spectroscopic studies indicate that monomeric GaH3 has a trigonal planar structure. Theoretical Ga-H bond lengths have been calculated as being in the range 155.7 pm to 158.7 pm.

Monomeric GaH3 dimerises in the vapor phase to form Ga2H6, digallane(6) and the enthalpy change associated with the gas phase dissociation reaction Ga2H6 → 2GaH3 has been experimentally estimated as 59 ± 16 kJ mol−1.

Chemical properties 
As GaH3 cannot be prepared or isolated readily reactions involving GaH3 either use the dimer, Ga2H6, digallane(6) or adducts of GaH3 for example L·GaH3 where L is a monodentate ligand.

GaH3 adducts
The production of adducts can proceed via the direct reaction of digallane(6) or more often due to the thermal fragility of digallane(6) (which decomposes to gallium metal and hydrogen above -20 °C) using a tetrahydridogallate salt as a starting point (e.g. LiGaH4) or alternatively via ligand displacement from an existing adduct.
Examples are:
Ga2H6 + 2 NMe3 → (NMe3)2·GaH3 (-95°C)
LiGaH4 + Me3NHCl → LiCl + H2+ Me3N·GaH3
Me2NH + Me3N·GaH3 → Me2NH·GaH3 + Me3N

Many adducts have been prepared. There are a number of typical structures with neutral adducts (L = monodentate ligand, L-L is bidentate):
L.GaH3 (1:1 complex with monodentate ligand giving 4 coordinate gallium)
L2·GaH3 (2:1 complex with monodentate ligand giving 5 coordinate gallium)
H3Ga·L-L·GaH3 (1:2 complex with a bidentate ligand with two 4 coordinate gallium atoms)
L'H3Ga·L-L·GaH3L' (complex with monodentate and bidentate ligands with two 5 coordinate gallium atoms)
LGaH2(μ-H)2GaH2L ( 2:2 hydrogen bridged complex)
(-L-LGaH3-)n (1:1 complex with a bidentate ligand forming a polymeric structure)
In comparison to alane (AlH3) with similar ligands, gallane tends to adopt lower coordination numbers. Also whilst N donor ligands form stronger bonds to alumane than phosphines the reverse is typically true for gallane.
The monomeric structure of Me3N.GaH3 has been confirmed in both the gas and solid phases. In this regard, the 1:1 adduct contrasts with the corresponding alane complex, Me3N.AlH3 which in the solid is dimeric with bridging hydrogen atoms.

Solute properties 

Gaseous gallane is a hydrophilic (non-polar) aprotic solute. It dissolves in polar compounds such as tetramethylethylenediamine, from which it can be crystallised as gallane—N,N,N′,N′-tetramethylethane-1,2-diamine (1/1).

Other chemical reactions 

Upon treatment with a standard base, it converts to a metal tetrahydroxygallanuide (the anion Ga(OH)4−) and hydrogen gas. 
With strong bases, it can be deprotonated to give . 
Reduction of gallane gives gallium metal. Upon treatment with a standard acid, it converts to a gallium(3+) salt and hydrogen gas. Oxidation of gallane gives Ga(OH)3, gallium(III) hydroxide.
Unsolvated gallane is in chemical equilibrium with digallane(6), being the dominant species with increasing temperature. Due to this equilibrium, gallane and digallane(6) are often considered to be chemically equivalent. Reactions requiring gallane as opposed to digallane(6), must be carried out in solution. Common solvents include tetrahydrofuran, and diethyl ether.

See also 
Digallane

References 

Gallium compounds